Micki Dickoff is an American director, writer and producer of social justice films. Her documentary Neshoba: The Price of Freedom, about justice, healing and racial reconciliation, opened theatrically in New York and Los Angeles, winning a number of Best Documentary and Special Jury Awards in film festivals worldwide. Neshoba was one of three finalists for the Humanitas Prize and selected to participate in the American Documentary Showcase in Kenya. Micki's latest film, The Gathering, profiles exonerated death row survivors who become warriors against the death penalty.  The film premiered at the Embassy of France in Washington, D.C., presented by the EU Delegation to the United States and won Best Short Documentary at the Fort Lauderdale International Film Festival. Her new film, The Legacy, focuses on generational poverty and children at risk. Filmed over more than two decades and still in progress, the film tells the story of three generations of an African American family trying to break the cycle of poverty, prison, drugs and injustice. Currently, Micki is in development on a feature film with Amblin Partners based on her childhood friend Sunny Jacobs' incredible story, as told in Sunny's book; Stolen Time: The Inspiring Story of an Innocent Woman Condemned to Death.  Micki will serve as executive producer.

Dickoff was raised and educated in New York and Florida and received her master's degree from the University of Florida where she was honored as an Alumna of Distinction and an Alumna of Outstanding Achievement. After graduate school, she moved to Boston and taught filmmaking at Grahm Junior College and Emerson College for more than a decade. After winning an Emmy Award for her AIDS documentary Too Little, Too Late, she went to Los Angeles to make dramatic films about AIDS and other social issues.

Dickoff was selected for the Directing Workshop for Women at the American Film Institute where she developed her multi-award-winning AIDS drama, Mother, Mother. The film was made through the generosity of the Hollywood community, including actors Bess Armstrong, Polly Bergen, Piper Laurie and John Dye, and composer Henry Mancini.  Singer-songwriter Cris Williamson wrote the title song. The film raised hundreds of thousands of dollars for AIDS research and patient support. Too Little, Too Late and Mother, Mother inspired Our Sons, a television movie Micki co-produced about AIDS and families starring Julie Andrews, Ann-Margret and Hugh Grant; the film won a Peabody Award.

Dickoff produced and directed, In the Blink of an Eye, a television movie about the death penalty and the power of friendship, starring Mimi Rogers, Veronica Hamel, Polly Bergen, Piper Laurie, Jeffrey Dean Morgan and Denise Richards. She directed and produced Bush's Deadly Ambition, a news feature for British television about the wrongful execution of Gary Graham (Shaka Sankofa) and presidential politics. Micki produced Life After Manson: The Untold Story of Patricia Krenwinkel, a cautionary tale about what led Manson follower Patricia Krenwinkel to participate in the notorious murders. The short documentary premiered at the 2014 Tribeca Film Festival in New York City.

Dickoff heads Pro Bono Productions where she continues to develop and produce documentary and narrative films.  She is a member of the Directors Guild of America (DGA) and the Independent Documentary Association (IDA).

Films 
 Stolen Time (in development)
 The Legacy (in post production)
 The Gathering
 In the Blink of an Eye
 Mother, Mother
 Neshoba: The Price of Freedom
 Get on Board
 Bush's Deadly Ambition
 Justice on Trial: The Case of Gary Graham
 Step By Step: A Journey of Hope
 Not in my Name
 Our Sons
 Something About The Women
 Goldbeating: The Making of Gold Leaf
 Food For Thought
 Show Me A Story
 Too Little, Too Late
 It's Never Too Late: A Portrait of Buffy
 Monday Morning Pronouns
 Life After Manson
 African Airlift (PSA)
 Rosie's Place (PSA)

External links 
 
 Micki Dickoff wins distinguished UF alumnus award 
 Article about "In the Blink of an Eye": 
 New York Times Review of "Neshoba": 
 Los Angeles Times Review of "Neshoba": 
 Film Journal Review of "Neshoba": 
 12 Must See Documentaries https://www.thoughtco.com/top-must-see-documentary-films-1109997
 Website "Neshoba: The Price of Freedom" www.neshobafilm.net
 Website "The Gathering" https://www.witnesstoinnocence.org/the-gathering-film

University of Florida alumni
American filmmakers
Place of birth missing (living people)
People from Florida
Living people
Year of birth missing (living people)